Tropical Cyclone Bingiza was the only named storm to make landfall in the inactive 2010–11 South-West Indian Ocean cyclone season. The second of three storms, Bingiza developed on February 9 to the northeast of Madagascar. For a few days it meandered generally southwestward, failing to intensify significantly. On February 12, the storm began a steady westward track as environmental conditions became more favorable. In a 24‑hour period, Bingiza developed from a moderate tropical storm into an intense tropical cyclone with a well-defined eye. Bingiza emerged into the Mozambique Channel as a weak tropical disturbance, and it turned southward to move across western Madagascar. Bingiza attained tropical storm status before making its final landfall near Morondava, degenerating into a remnant low on February 17, and dissipating two days later.

Across Madagascar, the cyclone killed 34 people and injured 13 others. High winds destroyed 25,464 houses, which left 25,845 people homeless. Bingiza first affected the Masoala National Park, destroying half of a village and leaving it isolated. High winds and heavy rainfall left over 500 km2km (195 mi2) of damaged crops, which increased food prices and threatened the economic livelihoods of the affected people.

Meteorological history

At the time, the system consisted of a poorly defined circulation, located in an area of low wind shear. It moved west-southwestward along the northern periphery of a ridge, and its convection gradually became more organized over the center. On February 9, Météo-France (MF) classified the system as Tropical Disturbance 5, and six hours later upgraded it to a tropical depression. Shortly thereafter, the Joint Typhoon Warning Center (JTWC) issued a tropical cyclone formation alert after convective banding and outflow increased. Following intensification of the depression into a moderate tropical storm, MF advised the Madagascan Weather Service to name the storm as Bingiza which they did late on February 9.

Upon becoming a tropical storm, Bingiza was located in an area of weak steering currents, which resulted in a slow, meandering motion toward the southwest. Its motion turned to the south on February 10, with conditions only marginally favorable for further intensification. After two days of meandering without strengthening, Bingiza turned to the southwest on due to a building ridge to its southwest toward Madagascar. Around the same time, upper-level conditions began improving, which allowed the convection to increase in coverage. Later that day an eye became apparent on satellite imagery, signaling the beginning of a rapid deepening trend. Late on February 12, MF upgraded Bingiza to tropical cyclone intensity, which is the equivalent of a hurricane or typhoon. Continuing to strengthen, Bingiza attained 10 minute sustained winds of  early on February 13.

Despite initial forecasts, the cyclone failed to strengthen further due to interaction with Madagascar. Early on February 14, Bingiza made landfall along the Masoala Peninsula with winds of at least . It emerged into the Antongil Bay, before moving ashore north of Manambolosy. It quickly weakened over land, although it produced heavy rainfall along its northern periphery. Early on February 15, Bingiza weakened to a tropical depression. The center became difficult to locate over land, although it emerged into the Mozambique Channel north of Besalampy as a tropical disturbance. After moving over waters, the system was able to re-intensify due to favorable water temperatures and inflow. It quickly organized into a tropical depression again, although strengthening was halted after it turned southward over western Madagascar due to a ridge to its north. It again moved into the Mozambique Channel, and Bingiza re-intensified into a tropical storm on February 17. The storm developed a concentrated area of convection near the center, as well as a poorly defined eye. The re-intensification was short-lived after Bingiza made its final landfall just south of Morondava around 1330 UTC on February 17. Around that time, the storm's circulation was dissipating over land, and its remnants left the island on February 19, dissipating soon afterward.

Impact

When Bingiza made its first Madagascar landfall, it became the first cyclone to strike the country in the cyclone season. It first moved through the Masoala National Park, a sparsely-populated protected region with significant numbers of trees. In Vinanivao, located along the Masoala peninsula, the cyclone destroyed half of the buildings as well as the roads and bridges, leaving it only accessible by boat. The cyclone affected five districts, primarily Mananara Nord. There, an early report indicated that 80% of the houses were destroyed, along with one hospital and four other health facilities. The high winds caused heavy crop damage, including to rice and banana, which left minimal food supplies in some areas. The vanilla crop was also severely affected, and the mayor of Mananara was uncertain whether any of the crop could be harvested. Bingiza struck at what one relief worker described as the "worst time of year for a cyclone", because many farmers were unable to replant their damaged crops. The cyclone damaged 40% of the food crops and 10% of the cash crops in Manambolosy, as well as 70% of the food crops in Antanambaobe. The cyclone also damaged the road infrastructure in Mananara, which made it difficult to transport fish in the region to other areas of the country. The resulting crop and road damage resulted in increased food prices.

Across its path, Bingiza destroyed 25,464 houses and damaged 36 schools. Overall, the damage was less than expected, given the strength of the cyclone. Most of the damage occurred due to the poor infrastructure and drainage systems of Madagascar, along with high levels of poverty. A total of 34 deaths were reported, along with 13 injuries. When Bingiza made its final landfall, it produced five days of rainfall to a region already severely affected by flooding. In Vangaindrano district in southeastern Madagascar, the cyclone caused widespread flooding that isolated five villages, as well as covering fields of rice and other crops. A total of 310 people in the southern portion of the country were left homeless.

Immediately after the storm moved ashore, high winds prevented disaster teams from assessing damage in the affected areas. By February 18, CARE international had dispatched relief teams to the most affected regions. The teams distributed plastic tarps and food for 10,000 people. High winds halted locust-control operations, while heavy rainfall provided favorable breeding conditions. In the area of the cyclone's first landfall, most people were able to rebuild their houses using trees and supplies from the surrounding countryside. Overall, about 25,845 people became homeless due to the cyclone, although most were able to return to their homes after a few days after they were repaired. In the months after the storm's passage, the European Commission allocated €200,000 ($287,000 USD) to CARE France for the storm victims.

See also

Cyclone Enawo

References

External links
Joint Typhoon Warning Center (JTWC) .
Météo France (RSMC La Réunion).
World Meteorological Organization

2010–11 South-West Indian Ocean cyclone season
2011 in Madagascar
Cyclones in Madagascar
Bingiza
Bingiza